Edgewood is a city in Clayton and Delaware counties in the U.S. state of Iowa. Highway 3, which runs through the center of town, is the dividing line between the two counties. The Edgewood post office was established in 1852 on the Clayton side of the town. Edgewood was formally incorporated in 1892, although it had a functioning council for some time before that date. The population was 909 at the time of the 2020 census, down from 923 in 2000.

Geography
Edgewood is located at  (42.644845, -91.401792).

Demographics

2010 census
As of the census of 2010, there were 864 people, 385 households, and 216 families living in the city. The racial makeup of the city was 99.1% White, 0.1% Native American, 0.1% from other races, and 0.7% from two or more races. Hispanic or Latino of any race were 0.7% of the population.

There were 385 households, of which 25.5% had children under the age of 18 living with them, 45.5% were married couples living together, 8.3% had a female householder with no husband present, 2.3% had a male householder with no wife present, and 43.9% were non-families. 38.7% of all households were made up of individuals, and 22.8% had someone living alone who was 65 years of age or older. The average household size was 2.09 and the average family size was 2.79.

The median age in the city was 46.6 years. 21.6% of residents were under the age of 18; 6% were between the ages of 18 and 24; 20.5% were from 25 to 44; 23.5% were from 45 to 64; and 28.6% were 65 years of age or older. The gender makeup of the city was 45.7% male and 54.3% female.

2000 census
As of the census of 2000, there were 923 people, 364 households, and 243 families living in the city. The racial makeup of the city was 99.46% White, 0.11% Native American, 0.22% from other races, and 0.22% from two or more races. Hispanic or Latino of any race were 0.76% of the population.

There were 364 households, out of which 32.1% had children under the age of 18 living with them, 55.2% were married couples living together, 8.0% had a female householder with no husband present, and 33.2% were non-families. 29.7% of all households were made up of individuals, and 18.7% had someone living alone who was 65 years of age or older. The average household size was 2.35 and the average family size was 2.91.

23.5% were under the age of 18, 7.4% from 18 to 24, 21.5% from 25 to 44, 21.5% from 45 to 64, and 26.2% were 65 years of age or older. The median age was 43 years. For every 100 females, there were 84.2 males. For every 100 females age 18 and over, there were 82.4 males.

The median income for a household in the city was $35,455, and the median income for a family was $42,946. Males had a median income of $29,000 versus $21,406 for females. The per capita income for the city was $16,187. About 0.8% of families and 4.7% of the population were below the poverty line, including none of those under age 18 and 15.2% of those age 65 or over.

Education
Edgewood–Colesburg Community School District operates public schools.

Events
The city and chamber of commerce host an annual rodeo, the Edgewood Rodeo Days, which includes events put on by the Professional Rodeo Cowboys Association.

See also
 Bixby State Preserve

Notable person

 Henry Otley Beyer, American anthropologist based in the Philippines.

References

External links
 City website

Cities in Iowa
Cities in Clayton County, Iowa
Cities in Delaware County, Iowa
1852 establishments in Iowa
Populated places established in 1852